The Women's Domestic All-First Team is an annual Úrvalsdeild honor bestowed on the best players in the league following every season.

All-time award winners
The following is a list of the recent Úrvalsdeild Women's Domestic All-First Teams.

References

External links
Icelandic Basketball Federation Official Website 

Úrvalsdeild kvenna (basketball)
European basketball awards